Mingtao's gecko (Gekko taibaiensis) is a species of gecko, a lizard in the family Gekkonidae. The species is endemic to China.

Geographic range
G. taibaiensis is known only from Taibai County in Shaanxi Province, China.

Habitat

Description
G. taibaiensis resembles G. japonicus and G. swinhonis. However, G. taibaiensis has fewer preanal pores, only 4–6, which are interruptedly arranged.

Reproduction
G. taibaiensis is oviparous.

References

Further reading
Song Mingtao (1985). "A new species of Gekko from Shaanxi". Acta Herpetologica Sinica 4: 329–330. (Gekko taibaiensis, new species). (in Chineses and English).

Gekko
Reptiles described in 1985
Reptiles of China